The University of Palermo (Spanish: Universidad de Palermo, abbreviated as UP) is a private university in Buenos Aires, Argentina. It has several buildings located in different parts of the city. The university offers several educational programs, including a double degree in Management awarded along with the London School of Economics. It has ties with the universities of Yale, Harvard and NYU among others and it is regarded as one of the best private universities in Argentina, constantly ranking in the top 5.

The University of Palermo's library has more than 45,000 volumes, including audio-visual and printed material. The collection can be searched through the Internet.

The university has seven departments with a total of more than 13,000 students, who come from all over the world.

History 
In 1986 a group of academics and intellectuals established the Fundación Universidad de Palermo (University of Palermo Foundation), with the idea of creating a university with the same name.

Ranking
According to the QS World University Rankings, UP is the sixth best private university in the country and is ranked fourth in Buenos Aires.

International ties 
The University of Palermo maintains ties with renowned international universities. Among the institutions that hold agreements with the university are: Yale, Harvard, NYU,  University of Paris III: Sorbonne Nouvelle, Peking University, USC, IIT, The Royal Danish Academy of Fine Arts and the Monterrey Institute of Technology and Higher Education). Besides, the University of Palermo is host to one of the UNESCO chairs, is a member of the ISEP, and a member of AACSB, and its Architecture career has been accredited by the Royal Institute of British Architects.
Academic agreements range from the exchange or visit by professors and alumni to joint research projects.

Its engineering department has recently tied as a member of the IEEE.

Ranking and reputation 
The Universidad de Palermo has been recognized by the following rankings:
 Top 400 worldwide - Times Higher Education World University Ranking 2015–2016
 Top 431 worldwide  - QS World University Rankings 2017–2018
 #61-70 worldwide  (#2 in Latin America) among less than 50 years old universities - Ranking QS Top 50 Under 50 2018
 Best for Design in Argentina, among top 4 in South America and among the top 40 worldwide - QS World University Rankings by Subject 2017–2018, Arts and Design
 University with the most international students in South America - QS World University Rankings 2017–2018
 Top 20 South America (Top 10 among privates) - QS World University Rankings 2015–2016

Notable alumni
 Patricia Bullrich - Minister of Security of Argentina
 Carla Rebecchi - hockey player
 Diego Bucchieri - skateboarder
 Marcelo Tribuj - entrepreneur, founder and CEO of Truelogic Software

References

External links 
* 

University of Palermo (Buenos Aires)
Private universities in Argentina
Education in Buenos Aires
Universities in Buenos Aires Province
1987 establishments in Argentina